Marc Endres (born 22 February 1991) is a German footballer manager and former player who manages TSV 1860 Rosenheim.

Career
On 13 May 2014, Endres signed a two-year contract with Chemnitzer FC.

In February 2021 he announced his retirement from playing due to injury problems. He became new manager of Regionalliga Bayern club TSV 1860 Rosenheim.

Honours
1. FC Heidenheim
 3. Liga: 2013–14
 Württemberg Cup: 2013–14

References

External links
 
 
 

Living people
1991 births
People from Friedrichshafen
Sportspeople from Tübingen (region)
Footballers from Baden-Württemberg
Association football central defenders
German footballers
Germany youth international footballers
SC Pfullendorf players
SC Freiburg players
1. FC Heidenheim players
Chemnitzer FC players
SpVgg Unterhaching players
3. Liga players
Regionalliga players
German football managers